Polycomb protein SCMH1 is a protein that in humans is encoded by the SCMH1 gene.

References

Further reading